The Residents Radio Special is an album released by The Residents in 1977. This cassette was a promotional item issued to radio stations shortly after the release of Fingerprince. It was soon offered through the mail-order service in limited quantities on cassette. The cassette was re-released in 1980 and 1984. A limited edition, entitled Eat Exuding Oinks!, was released in 2001, featuring the original radio show and the digitally remastered versions of the songs. A highlight is the first official release of the cover of The Mothers of Invention's "King Kong", with Snakefinger on guitar.

Track list

Original track list
 Introduction
 Death in Barstow
 Interview
 Beyond the Valley of a Day in the Life
 Flying
 Satisfaction
 Interview
 Loser  Weed
 Interview
 Melon Collie Lassie
 Interview
 Santa Dog
 Interview
 King Kong
 Interview
 Kamakazi Lady
 Whoopy Snorp
 Interview
 Walter Westinghouse
 Credits

Eat Exuding Oinks! track list
Ralph Records' 1977 Radio Special
 Part 1
 Part 2
 Part 3
 Part 4
 Monstrous Intro
 Death in Barstow
 Beyond the Valley of a Day in the Life
 Flying
 King Kong
 Whoopy Snorp
 Melon Collie Lassie
 Kamikazi Lady

The Residents albums
1979 albums